Satan in High Heels is a 1962 American sexploitation film directed by Jerald Intrator and starring Meg Myles and Grayson Hall.

Plot
Stacey Kane (Myles), a cunning and ambitious striptease dancer in a cheap carnival, tricks her heroin-addicted husband out of his money and leaves him, clothed only in a corset and raincoat.  On a plane to New York, she meets a well-heeled businessman, Louie, who falls for her charms and sets her up in a hotel.  He arranges an audition for her at a Manhattan midtown club run by an elegant, world-weary lesbian named Pepe (Hall).

Stacey wows them with her vocal ability and begins being groomed as a leading chanteuse at the night club.  Arnold Kenyon, the club's owner, falls in love with Stacey and makes her his mistress, unaware that while he is lavishing her with expensive gifts and grooming her for a singing debut at his club, she is also having an affair with his playboy son, Laurence.

On her opening night, Stacey's estranged husband, Rudy, arrives at the club. Using both emotional and sexual appeal, Stacey persuades him to kill Arnold; but Rudy bungles the murder attempt and confesses his intention to Arnold.  Her double-dealing nature out in the open, Stacey is abandoned by all the men in her life, put out of her apartment, and left alone on the streets.

Cast
 Meg Myles as Stacey
 Grayson Hall as Pepe 
 Del Tenney as Paul
 Sabrina as herself 
 Mike Keane as Arnold Kenyon
 Robert Yuro as Laurence Kenyon

Production notes
The film used Manhattan locations Club Le Martinique at 57 West 57th Street and Sutton Place neighborhood for the apartments where Pepe and the Kenyons live.

Producer Leonard Burtman was a major New York publisher of dozens of fetish magazines such as the pioneering Exotique, Bizarre Life, High Heels, Unique World, and Corporal. In 1962, a few of his publications ran photo-features promoting this film.

Soundtrack

The film score was composed, arranged and conducted by Mundell Lowe and the soundtrack album was originally released on the Charlie Parker label. The soundtrack was also released as Blues for a Stripper.

Reception

In his review for the June 6, 1963, issue of Down Beat magazine, jazz critic John S. Wilson wrote: "Guitarist Lowe has put together a walloping big band, given it some strong punchy arrangements to play, and has come through with a set of rousing performances."

The Allmusic review states "Mundell Lowe's score for the exploitation flick Satan in High Heels is an immensely enjoyable collection of exaggeratedly cinematic jazz. Lowe runs through all sorts of styles, from swinging big band to cool jazz, from laid-back hard-bop to driving bop".

Track listing
All compositions by Mundell Lowe.
 "Satan in High Heels" - 3:24     
 "Montage" - 2:11     
 "The Lost and the Lonely" - 3:38     
 "East Side Drive" - 2:48     
 "Coffee, Coffee" - 3:27     
 "Lake in the Woods" - 3:30     
 "From Mundy On" - 3:27     
 "The Long Knife" - 2:22     
 "Blues for a Stripper" - 3:27     
 "Pattern of Evil" - 2:26  
Recorded in New York City on November 30 (tracks 2, 3, 6 & 10) and December 23 (tracks 1, 4, 5 & 7-9), 1961

Personnel
Mundell Lowe - guitar, arranger, conductor
Bernie Glow (tracks 1, 4, 5 & 7-9), Joe Newman (tracks 2, 3, 6 & 10), Ernie Royal (tracks 1, 4, 5 & 7-9), Doc Severinsen, Clark Terry - trumpet
Jimmy Cleveland (tracks 1, 4, 5 & 7-9), Buster Cooper, Urbie Green (tracks 2, 3, 6 & 10) - trombone
Jim Buffington - French horn (tracks 2, 3, 6 & 10)
Ray Beckenstein - alto saxophone, flute (tracks 2, 3, 6 & 10)
Walter Levinsky - alto saxophone, clarinet
Phil Woods - alto saxophone (tracks 1, 4, 5 & 7-9)
Al Cohn, Al Klink (tracks 2, 3, 6 & 10), Oliver Nelson (tracks 1, 4, 5 & 7-9) - tenor saxophone
Gene Allen (tracks 1, 4, 5 & 7-9), Sol Schlinger (tracks 2, 3, 6 & 10) - baritone saxophone
Eddie Costa - piano, vibraphone
Barry Galbraith - guitar (tracks 1, 4, 5 & 7-9)
George Duvivier - bass
Ed Shaughnessy - drums

Staged adaptation
In 2012, Trustus Theatre hosted a reading of a stage adaptation of Satan in High Heels written by playwright and screenwriter Robbie Robertson. Directed by Timothy Gardner, the staged reading featured Vicky Saye Henderson as Stacy Kane, Rodney Lee Rogers as Arnold Kenyon, and Larry Hembree as Pepe.

DVD release
The film was released on Region 1 DVD by Something Weird Video in 2002.

References

External links
 

1962 films
1962 drama films
American drama films
American black-and-white films
Films set in New York City
Films shot in New York City
American independent films
American sexploitation films
1960s English-language films
1960s American films